Marsan is commune in Gers, France.

Marsan may also refer to:

People
 Armando Marsans (1887–1960), Major League Baseball outfielder
 Arnaut Guilhem de Marsan (fl. 1160–1180), Landais nobleman and troubadour
 Eddie Marsan (born 1968), British actor
 Eugène Marsan (1882–1936), French author and literary critic
 Georges Marsan (born 1957), Mayor of Monaco since 2003
 Jean Marsan (1920–1977), French screenwriter and actor
 Jeanne-Marie Marsan (1746–1807), French actress and singer
 Luis Marsans (1930–2015), Catalan painter
 Madame de Marsan (1720–1803), Countess de Marsan, Countess de Walhain, children's governess in France
 Marco Marsan (born 1957), American author
 Maurice de Marsan (1852–1929), French poet, novelist, and director
 Pierre Marsan (born 1948), Quebec politician

Places

Azerbaijan 
 Marsan, Azerbaijan, village and municipality in the Qakh Rayon

France 
 Bretagne-de-Marsan, town and commune in the Landes département
 Mont-de-Marsan, commune, préfecture of the Landes département
 Villeneuve-de-Marsan, village and commune in the Landes département